The Glyphipterigidae are a family of small moths commonly known as sedge moths, as the larvae of many species feed on sedges and rushes. More than 500 species have been described in the family.

Characters
The moths have a wingspan of 7 to 16 millimeters.They have a slender and elongated body. The fore wings are narrow to wide and are two to four times longer than wide. They have 13 veins; with 2 anal veins (1b and 1c).The hind wings are frayed and have a similar width to the front wings. The hindwings have well developed neuration; 7–10 veined either with no or 3 anal veins (1a,1b and 1c).There are some species that have metallic shiny wings or metallic patterns on the wings  (often metallic crescent markings along the costa and inner margin of the forewings). The antennae are half as long, to the same length as the front wings. In addition to the compound eyes, the moths also have ocelli. Their maxillary palpi may be well developed or strongly regressed, the proboscis is fully developed and lacks scales.

Genera

Abrenthia
Anacampsiodes
Carmentina
Chrysocentris
Circica
Cotaena
Cronicombra
Diploschizia
Drymoana
Electrographa
Ernolytis
Eusthenica
Glyphipterix
Irinympha
Lepidotarphius
Machlotica
Neomachlotica
Orthotelia
Pantosperma
Phalerarcha
Rhabdocrates
Sericostola
Taeniostolella
Tetracmanthes
Toxopeia
Trapeziophora
Uranophenga
Ussara

Selected former genera
Setiostoma

References
Natural History Museum Lepidoptera Genus Database

External links
Family description

 
Moth families